Arcadia High School is a public high school in Arcadia, Ohio, United States.  It is the only high school in the Arcadia Local School district. The school is a member of the Blanchard Valley Conference.

Notable alumni
 Jerry Blevins, former MLB player (Oakland Athletics, Washington Nationals, New York Mets)

See also
Native American mascot controversy
Sports teams named Redskins

References

External links
 District website

High schools in Hancock County, Ohio
Public high schools in Ohio